Interstate 310 (I-310), also designated as Mississippi Highway 601 (MS 601), is a proposed auxiliary route of I-10 in Gulfport, Mississippi. It is planned to travel from U.S. Route 90 (US 90) near the Port of Gulfport to I-10.

Route description 
 
The road is planned to travel from I-10 in the northern part of the city south to US 90 near the Port of Gulfport and Downtown Gulfport. Officials want the highway to be as close as possible to the port so it can be accessed easily.

History
The highway's designation was at first considered to be I-210 but, because the Interstate is going to the port and not going to connect back to I-10 forming a loop, the road was numbered I-310; I-110 was already taken in nearby Biloxi. The original state highway designation for the freeway was proposed as Mississippi Highway 977 (MS 977), but has since been changed to MS 601. The design of the highway began in 2005 and the right-of-way acquisitions started in 2006. This put the estimated completion date to 2012. Construction was supposedly started in 2008, but, as of 2020, construction had not started. The Mississippi Department of Transportation (MDOT) wanted the road to be an elevated freeway like its sister road, I-110.

See also

References

External links

 Interstate 310 on Interstate-guide.com

10-3
3 (Mississippi)
10-3 (Mississippi)
Buildings and structures in Gulfport, Mississippi
Transportation in Harrison County, Mississippi
10-3 (Mississippi)